San Elijo State Beach is a California State Beach in San Diego County, California, United States.

Location
San Elijo State Beach is near San Diego, by San Elijo Lagoon, adjacent to the Cardiff State Beach.

San Elijo State Beach offers swimming, surfing, boogie-boarding, skim-boarding, showers, picnicking, and camping. Campsite reservations are made through Reserve America, and sites book up to 6 months in advance. The narrow, bluff-backed stretch of sand has a nearby reef popular with snorkelers and divers. Also, at low tide, there is a tide pool that many walk to in order to see the sea life.

The campsite is great for family and friends. It is located on a bluff right above the beach. It is perfect for photographers everywhere to get that perfect shot of a sunset. Jellyfish are frequent in the area, many see them either during the day or when at low tide.

See also 
 Cardiff Kook
 List of beaches in California
 List of California state parks

References

External links
 official San Elijo State Beach website

Beaches of Southern California
California State Beaches
Parks in San Diego County, California
Beaches of San Diego County, California
Campgrounds in California